Daniel Bramble (born 14 October 1990 in Chesterfield, Derbyshire, England) is an English athlete specialising in the long jump. He represented his country at the 2015 World Championships and 2016 World Indoor Championships.

His personal bests in the event are 8.21 metres outdoors (+1.8 m/s, Clermont 2015) and 8.14 metres indoors (Portland 2016).

Competition record

References

External links
 
 
 
 
 
 
 

Living people
1990 births
Sportspeople from Chesterfield, Derbyshire
English male long jumpers
British male long jumpers
Commonwealth Games competitors for England
Athletes (track and field) at the 2018 Commonwealth Games
World Athletics Championships athletes for Great Britain
British Athletics Championships winners